Thushira Madanayake (born 10 August 1981) is a Sri Lankan cricketer. He made his first-class debut in the 2000/01 season, and has played more than 50 first-class matches to date. He made his Twenty20 debut on 17 August 2004, for Burgher Recreation Club in the 2004 SLC Twenty20 Tournament.

References

External links
 

1981 births
Living people
Sri Lankan cricketers
Burgher Recreation Club cricketers
Lankan Cricket Club cricketers
Place of birth missing (living people)